The 1980 Giro di Lombardia was the 74th edition of the Giro di Lombardia cycle race and was held on 18 October 1980. The race started in Milan and finished in Como. The race was won by Alfons De Wolf of the Boule d'Or team.

General classification

References

1980
Giro di Lombardia
Giro di Lombardia
1980 Super Prestige Pernod